L'ospite is a 1972 Italian drama film directed by Liliana Cavani and starring Lucia Bosè. The plot follows a woman who, once released from a mental hospital, tries in vain to fit into society. Made with a very low budget, it was shown out of competition at the Venice Film Festival.

Plot
A writer, obtains permission to visit a psychiatric hospital in order to prepare for his next novel. He finds several deficiencies in both the medical and social treatment of the patients. His criticisms are not well received by the doctors. the writer meets Anna, a woman who healed from her mental issues, has been entrusted to the care of her brother. Anna's reintegration into her family and society have proved difficult.

Cast
 Lucia Bosè as Anna
 Glauco Mauri as Piero
Peter Gonzales as Luciano
Alvaro Piccardi as Anna's brother
Giancarlo Caio as the doctor
Gian Piero Frondini
Alfio Galardi
Maddalena Gillia
Maria Luisa Salmaso
Lorenzo Piani

Notes

References 
 Marrone, Gaetana. The Gaze and the Labyrinth: the Cinema of Liliana Cavani. Princenton Paperbacks, 2000.

External links
 Detailed information on this film.

1972 films
Italian drama films
1970s Italian-language films
1972 drama films
Films directed by Liliana Cavani
1970s Italian films